Jason Curtis Brissett (born 7 September 1974) is an English former professional footballer who played as a midfielder.

Career
After playing youth football with Brimsdown Rovers (alongside David Beckham) and Arsenal, Brissett played professionally with Peterborough United, Bournemouth, Walsall, Cheltenham Town, Leyton Orient and Stevenage Borough.

Personal life 
Brissett's son Jaden is also a footballer.

References

External links

1974 births
Living people
English footballers
Arsenal F.C. players
Peterborough United F.C. players
AFC Bournemouth players
Walsall F.C. players
Cheltenham Town F.C. players
Leyton Orient F.C. players
Stevenage F.C. players
Brimsdown Rovers F.C. players
Association football midfielders